Peter Kjær may refer to:

 Peter Kjær (footballer) (born 1965), Danish footballer, television commentator and sporting director
 Peter Kjær (architect), rector of Umeå School of Architecture
 Peter Kjær (figure skater)